Aretino is a surname or demonym (meaning 'from Arezzo'), and may refer to:

 Pietro Aretino (1492–1556), Italian writer and controversialist; a reference to plain "Aretino" usually refers to him
 Maginardo (fl. 1006–1032), called Aretino, an Italian architect
 Spinello Aretino (c. 1330 - c. 1410), Italian painter
 Leonardo Bruni or Leonardo Aretino (c. 1370 – 1444), Florentine humanist, historian and chancellor 
 Carlo Marsuppini or Carlo Aretino (1399-1453), Italian humanist and statesman.
 Paolo Aretino or Paolo Antonio del Bivi (1508–1584), Italian composer
 Aretino Records, record company in existence from 1907 to 1914